Earl Douglas Cash (15 July 1919 – 15 February 2002) was an Australian politician.

Life
Born in Manitoba, Canada, he migrated to Australia in 1923, where he attended Perth Boys' School and the University of Western Australia. He was a public servant before serving in the military 1940–1946. After the war, he became a businessman.

In 1958, he was elected to the Australian House of Representatives as the Liberal member for Stirling, defeating sitting Labor member Harry Webb. He was defeated by Webb in 1961. In 1968, Cash was elected to the Western Australian Legislative Assembly as the member for Mirrabooka, a position he held until 1971. He died in 2002.

References

Liberal Party of Australia members of the Parliament of Australia
Members of the Australian House of Representatives for Stirling
Members of the Australian House of Representatives
1919 births
2002 deaths
Liberal Party of Australia members of the Parliament of Western Australia
Canadian emigrants to Australia
People from Manitoba
20th-century Australian politicians